In internal combustion engines, exhaust gas recirculation (EGR) is a nitrogen oxide emissions reduction technique used in petrol/gasoline, diesel engines and some hydrogen engines. EGR works by recirculating a portion of an engine's exhaust gas back to the engine cylinders.  The exhaust gas displaces atmospheric air and reduces  in the combustion chamber. Reducing the amount of oxygen reduces the amount of fuel that can burn in the cylinder thereby reducing peak in-cylinder temperatures.  The actual amount of recirculated exhaust gas varies with the engine operating parameters.

In the combustion cylinder,  is produced by high-temperature mixtures of atmospheric nitrogen and oxygen, and this usually occurs at cylinder peak pressure. In a spark-ignition engine, an ancillary benefit of recirculating exhaust gases via an external EGR valve is an increase in efficiency, as charge dilution allows a larger throttle position and reduces associated pumping losses. Mazda's turbocharged SkyActiv direct injection gas engine uses recirculated and cooled exhaust gases to reduce combustion chamber temperatures, thereby permitting the engine to run at higher boost levels before the air-fuel mixture must be enriched to prevent engine knocking.
  
In a gasoline engine, this inert exhaust displaces some amount of combustible charge in the cylinder, effectively reducing the quantity of charge available for combustion without affecting the air-fuel ratio. In a diesel engine, the exhaust gas replaces some of the excess oxygen in the pre-combustion mixture. Because  forms primarily when a mixture of nitrogen and oxygen is subjected to high temperature, the lower combustion chamber temperatures caused by EGR reduces the amount of  that the combustion process generates. Chemical properties of different fuels limit how much EGR may be used. For example methanol is more tolerant to EGR than gasoline.

History 
The first EGR systems were crude; some were as simple as an orifice jet between the exhaust and intake tracts which admitted exhaust to the intake tract whenever the engine was running. Difficult starting, rough idling, reduced performance and lost fuel economy inevitably resulted. By 1973, an EGR valve controlled by manifold vacuum opened or closed to admit exhaust to the intake tract only under certain conditions. Control systems grew more sophisticated as automakers gained experience; Volkswagen's "Coolant Controlled Exhaust Gas Recirculation" system of 1973 exemplified this evolution: a coolant temperature sensor blocked vacuum to the EGR valve until the engine reached normal operating temperature. This prevented driveability problems due to unnecessary exhaust induction;  forms under elevated temperature conditions generally not present with a cold engine. Later, backpressure transducers were added to the EGR valve control to further tailor EGR flow to engine load conditions. Most modern engines now need exhaust gas recirculation to meet  emissions standards. However, recent innovations have led to the development of engines that do not require them. The 3.6 Chrysler Pentastar engine is one example that does not require EGR.

EGR 

The exhaust gas contains water vapor and carbon dioxide which both have lower heat capacity ratio than air. Adding exhaust gas therefore reduces pressure and temperature during the isentropic compression in the cylinder, thereby lowering the adiabatic flame temperature.

In a typical automotive spark-ignited (SI) engine, 5% to 15% of the exhaust gas is routed back to the intake as EGR. The maximum quantity is limited by the need of the mixture to sustain a continuous flame front during the combustion event; excessive EGR in poorly set up applications can cause misfires and partial burns. Although EGR does measurably slow combustion, this can largely be compensated for by advancing spark timing. The impact of EGR on engine efficiency largely depends on the specific engine design, and sometimes leads to a compromise between efficiency and  emissions. In certain types of situations, a properly operating EGR can theoretically increase the efficiency of gasoline engines via several mechanisms:
 Reduced throttle losses. The addition of inert exhaust gas into the intake system means that for a given power output, the throttle plate must be opened further, resulting in increased inlet manifold pressure and reduced throttling losses.
 Reduced heat rejection. Lowered peak combustion temperatures not only reduces  formation, it also reduces the loss of thermal energy to combustion chamber surfaces, leaving more available for conversion to mechanical work during the expansion stroke.
 Reduced chemical dissociation. The lower peak temperatures result in more of the released energy remaining as sensible energy near Top Dead Center (TDC), rather than being bound up (early in the expansion stroke) in the dissociation of combustion products. This effect is minor compared to the first two.

EGR is typically not employed at high loads because it would reduce peak power output. This is because it reduces the intake charge density. EGR is also omitted at idle (low-speed, zero load) because it would cause unstable combustion, resulting in rough idle.

Since the EGR system recirculates a portion of exhaust gases, over time the valve can become clogged with carbon deposits, which will prevent it from operating properly. Clogged EGR valves can sometimes be cleaned, but replacement is necessary if the valve is faulty.

Diesel engines 

  
Because diesel engines depend on the heat of compression to ignite their fuel, they are fundamentally different from spark-ignited engines.  The physical process of diesel-fuel combustion is such that the most complete combustion occurs at the highest temperatures.  Unfortunately, the production of nitrogen oxides increases at high temperatures.  The goal of EGR is thus to reduce  production by reducing the combustion temperatures.
  
In modern diesel engines, the EGR gas is usually cooled with a heat exchanger to allow the introduction of a greater mass of recirculated gas. However, uncooled EGR designs do exist; these are often referred to as hot-gas recirculation (HGR).  
  
Unlike spark-ignition engines, diesel engines are not limited by the need for a contiguous flamefront.  Furthermore, since diesels always operate with excess air, they benefit (in terms of reduced  output) from EGR rates as high as 50%.  However, a 50% EGR rate is only suitable when the diesel engine is at idle, since this is when there is otherwise a large excess of air.  
  
Because modern diesel engines often have a throttle, EGR can reduce the need for throttling, thereby eliminating this type of loss in the same way that it does for spark-ignited engines. In a naturally aspirated (i.e. nonturbocharged) engine, such a reduction in throttling also reduces the problem of engine oil being sucked past the piston rings into the cylinder and causing oil-derived carbon deposits there.  (This benefit only applies to nonturbocharged engines.)  
  
In diesel engines in particular, EGeR systems come with serious drawbacks, one of which is a reduction in engine longevity.  For example, because the EGR system routes exhaust gas directly back into the cylinder intake without any form of filtration, this exhaust gas contains carbon particulates.  And, because these tiny particles are abrasive, the recirculation of this material back into the cylinder increases engine wear.  This is so because these carbon particles will blow by the piston rings (causing piston-cylinder-interface wear in the process) and then end up in the crankcase oil, where they will cause further wear throughout the engine simply because their tiny size passes through typical oil filters.  This enables them to be recirculated indefinitely (until the next oil change takes place).
    
Exhaust gas—which consists largely of nitrogen, carbon dioxide, and water vapor—has a higher specific heat than air, so it still serves to lower peak combustion temperatures. However, adding EGR to a diesel reduces the specific heat ratio of the combustion gases in the power stroke. This reduces the amount of power that can be extracted by the piston, thereby reducing the thermodynamic efficiency.    .. 
  
EGR also tends to reduce the completeness of fuel combustion during the power stroke.  This is plainly evident by the increase in particulate emissions that corresponds to an increase in EGR.
 
Particulate matter (mainly carbon and also known as soot) that is not burned in the power stroke represents wasted energy.  Because of stricter regulations on particulate matter (PM), the soot-increasing effect of EGR required the introduction of further emission controls in order to compensate for the resulting PM emission increases.  The most common soot-control device is a diesel particulate filter (DPF) installed downstream of the engine in the exhaust system.  This captures soot but causes a reduction in fuel efficiency due to the back pressure created. 
 
Diesel particulate filters come with their own set of very specific operational and maintenance requirements.  Firstly, as the DPFU captures the soot particles (which are made far more numerous due to the use of EGR), the DPF itself progressively becomes loaded with soot.  This soot must then be burned off, either actively or passively. 
     
At sufficiently high temperatures, the nitrogen dioxide component of  emissions is the primary oxidizer of the soot caught in the DPF at normal operating temperatures.  This process is known as passive regeneration, and it is only partially effective at burning off the captured soot.   And, especially at high EGR rates, the effectiveness of passive regeneration is further reduced.  This, in turn, necessitates periodic active regeneration of the DPF by burning diesel fuel directly in the oxidation catalyst in order to significantly increase exhaust-gas temperatures through the DPF to the point where PM is incinerated by the residual oxygen in the exhaust.
  
Because diesel fuel and engine oil both contain nonburnable (i.e. metallic and mineral) impurities, the incineration of soot (PM) in the DPF leaves behind a residue known as ash.  For this reason, after repeated regeneration events, eventually the DPF must either be physically removed and cleaned in a special external process, or it must be replaced.
  
But this simultaneously makes combustion less efficient, thus reducing fuel efficiency and compromising power. (These losses are in addition to the losses created by the DPF backpressure and the extra fuel burning for active DPF regeneration.) The translates into the need for a bigger, bulkier engine. Alternatively, the engine can be operated at a higher rotation speed, which in turn also increases mechanical wear and reduces lifespan.
   
With EGR, the normally "dry" intake system of a diesel engine is now subject to fouling from soot, unburned (and semi-burned) fuel, and also oil in the EGR bleed gas.  Although airflow into the engine remains high, the mixture of exhaust gas and fresh air is also combined with oil vapor from a positive crankcase ventilation system (PCV) system.  This tripartite mixture (i.e. exhaust gas, fresh air, and oil vapour) can cause the buildup of sticky tar in the intake manifold and valves.  This mixture can also cause problems with components such as swirl flaps, where fitted.  (These problems, which effectively take the form of an undesirable positive-feedback loop, will worsen as the engine ages.  For example, as the piston rings progressively wear out, more crankcase oil will get into the exhaust stream.  Simultaneously, more fuel and soot and combustion byproducts will gain access to the engine oil.)
 
The end result of this recirculation of both exhaust gas and crankcase oil vapour is again an increase in sooot production, which is merely masked by the DPF. 
  
In addition to the abrasive contaminants that EGR systems bring into the combustion chamber, and also given that exhaust gas contains water vapour, modern cooled EGR systems also induce the formation of both nitric acid (from ) aend sulphuric acid (since some sulphur remains in low-sulphur diesel fuel).  These acids will be introduced into the combustion chamber via the intake valves, whereupon they will enter the crankcase via piston blow-by.  Because these acids are highly corrosive to metal, the resulting increase in engine oil acidity can be expected to also reduce overall engine longevity.
  
Although engine manufacturers have refused to release details of the effect of EGR on fuel economy, the EPA regulations of 2002 that led to the introduction of cooled EGR were associated with a 3% drop in engine efficiency, thus bucking the trend of a 0.5% annual increase.

See also
 Diesel exhaust
 Secondary air injection

Sources 
 Heywood, John B., "Internal Combustion Engine Fundamentals," McGraw Hill, 1988.
 van Basshuysen, Richard, and Schäfer, Fred, "Internal Combustion Engine Handbook," SAE International, 2004.
 "Bosch Automotive Handbook," 3rd Edition, Robert Bosch GmbH, 1993.

References

External links 

 Lecture notes on improving fuel efficiency that discusses the effects of specific heat ratio, University of Washington
 Diesel cycle calculator that can be used to show the effect of specific heat ratio, Georgia State University HyperPhysics
 A Chrysler Imperial fan club describes different EGR control mechanisms 
 Don’t Block or Remove the EGR Valve, It’s Saving You Money
 What are the symptoms of bad EGR valve

Engine technology
Chemical process engineering
Air pollution control systems
NOx control